Thor Nielsen (born 11 July 1959) is a Danish sprint and marathon canoeist who competed from the mid-1980s to the late 1990s. He won five medals at the ICF Canoe Sprint World Championships with two golds (K-1 10000 m: 1993, K-2 1000 m: 1994), two silvers (K-1 1000 m: 1993, K-2 10000 m: 1987), and a bronze (K-4 10000 m: 1985).

Nielsen also competed in two Summer Olympics, earning his best finish of sixth twice (K-2 500 m: 1992, K-2 1000 m: 1996).

Nielsen is currently working as the national coach of Denmark

References

1959 births
Living people
Danish male canoeists
Olympic canoeists of Denmark
Canoeists at the 1992 Summer Olympics
Canoeists at the 1996 Summer Olympics
ICF Canoe Sprint World Championships medalists in kayak
Medalists at the ICF Canoe Marathon World Championships